Sahar Moghadass (born 4 December 1985), known mononymously as Sahar, is an Iranian singer, musician and dancer. She is known for her contributions to Persian pop music.

Early life and education 
Sahar Moghadass was born in Tehran, Iran. Her father was from Tehran, while her mother was from Semnan. Her grandfather is of Bulgarian origins. Sahar developed an interest in music at a precocious age. Her family encouraged her to pursue music and solfège classes with Iranian pop and folk music celebrity Mohammad Nouri. Sahar obtained a women's concert license from the Ministry of Culture and Islamic Guidance at the age of 17.  Sahar obtained her Bachelor of Arts degree from the University of Tehran.

Career 
Sahar performed in women-only events under the Iranian government's sex segregation policy. In 2004, Sahar left Iran because of the performing restrictions and emigrated to the UAE where she obtained Emirati citizenship.

Sahar's international professional debut was in 2012 with the song To Nabashi [You Are Not], but she didn't achieve widespread notability until 2017. Sahar isn't married.

Her "Ey Vay" video has over 24 million views on YouTube as of February 2022. Which made this video the most viewed music video on the Radio Javan Channel.

Discography

EPs

Singles

References

External links

 
 Sahar on Spotify

1985 births
Living people
People from Tehran
Singers from Tehran
Persian-language singers
Iranian women pop singers
21st-century Iranian women singers